The discography of Bridgit Mendler, an American singer-songwriter, consists of one studio album, one extended play, one soundtrack album, four singles, six promotional singles, twelve music videos and other album appearances. Her first soundtrack, Lemonade Mouth, has peaked at number 4 on the Billboard 200. Her first single, "Somebody" debuted and peaked at number 89 in the US Billboard Hot 100 and sold 6,000 copies in the first week in the United States according to Nielsen SoundScan. Her second single, "Determinate" peaked at number 51 on the US Billboard Hot 100 and charting in two more countries. She was featured in the song, "Breakthrough" and debuted and peaked at number 88 on the US Billboard Hot 100.

On March 31, 2011, it was confirmed that Mendler had signed with Hollywood Records and had begun working on her debut album. In 2012, Mendler released her debut album Hello My Name Is..., which featured a pop sound. It debuted at number 30 on the US Billboard 200, and has sold over 200,000 copies. Her debut single from the album "Ready or Not" became an international Top 40 hit, the song was certified gold in Norway, and platinum in New Zealand, United States and Canada and peaked at number 49 on the Billboard Hot 100. Her second single "Hurricane" has been certified gold in the USA for selling 500,000 copies.

Albums

Studio albums

Soundtrack albums

Extended plays

Singles

As lead artist

As featured artist

Promotional singles

Other charted songs

Other appearances

Other credits

Music videos

Footnotes

References

Discography
Pop music discographies
Discographies of American artists